Mount McDonald is a peak rising to  on the north side of Trafalgar Glacier,  northwest of Mount Burton, in the Victory Mountains of Victoria Land, Antarctica. It was named by the New Zealand Federated Mountain Clubs Antarctic Expedition (NZFMCAE), 1962–63, for William McDonald, a crew member on the Terra Nova during the British Antarctic Expedition, 1910–13. McDonald, who lived in New Zealand, was a guest of the U.S. Navy during the 1962–63 Antarctic season when he visited the continent again with two others of Robert Falcon Scott's veterans.

References

Mountains of Victoria Land
Borchgrevink Coast